A Voice Said Goodnight is a 1932 British crime film directed by William C. McGann and starring Nora Swinburne, Jack Trevor and D. A. Clarke-Smith. It was made at Teddington Studios by Warner Brothers. A scene was also shot at nearby Teddington Lock.

Cast
 Nora Swinburne as Joan Creighton  
 Jack Trevor as Gerald Creighton  
 D. A. Clarke-Smith as Philip Gaylor  
 John Turnbull as Inspector Lavory  
 Daphne Scorer as Annie  
 Wilfrid Caithness as Beldon  
 Roland Culver as Reporter

References

Bibliography
 Chibnall, Steve. Quota Quickies: The Birth of the British 'B' Film. British Film Institute, 2007.

External links

1932 films
British crime films
1932 crime films
Films shot at Teddington Studios
Films directed by William C. McGann
Warner Bros. films
Quota quickies
Films set in England
British black-and-white films
1930s English-language films
1930s British films